In Irish mythology, Banba (modern spelling: Banbha ), daughter of Delbáeth and Ernmas of the Tuatha Dé Danann, is a matron goddess of Ireland. She was married to Mac Cuill, a grandson of the Dagda.

She was part of an important triumvirate of matron goddesses, with her sisters, Ériu and Fódla. According to Seathrún Céitinn she worshipped Macha, who is also sometimes named as a daughter of Ernmas. The two goddesses may therefore be seen as equivalent. Céitinn also refers to a tradition that Banbha was the first person to set foot in Ireland before the flood, in a variation of the legend of Cessair.

In the Tochomlad mac Miledh a hEspain i nErind: no Cath Tailten, it is related that as the Milesians were journeying through Ireland, "they met victorious Banba among her troop of faery magic hosts" on Senna Mountain, the stony mountain of Mes. A footnote identifies this site as Slieve Mish in Chorca Dhuibne, County Kerry. The soil of this region is a non-leptic podzol . If the character of Banba originated in an earth-goddess, non-leptic podzol may have been the particular earth-type of which she was the deification.

The LÉ Banba (CM11), a ship in the Irish Naval Service, was named after her.

Initially, she could have been a goddess of war as well as a fertility goddess.

References

Irish goddesses
Tuatha Dé Danann
War goddesses
Fertility goddesses
Tutelary deities
Irish royal consorts
Personifications of Ireland
National personifications
Names for Ireland